Stephen Hill Spruiell (born November 20, 1979) has worked as a writer and columnist for the National Review. He has also worked as an aide to Rep. Paul Ryan and as a speechwriter for Romney for President.

Personal
Spruiell is a native of Arlington, Texas.

Education
Spruiell received his BA in journalism from the University of Oklahoma in 2002.

Spruiell was a Koch Summer Fellow, Class of 2002, at the Institute for Humane Studies at George Mason University in Arlington, Virginia.

Spruiell received his master's degree in public affairs from the LBJ School at the University of Texas, Austin in 2005.

References

External links
 

1979 births
Living people
American columnists
American male journalists
Lyndon B. Johnson School of Public Affairs alumni
National Review people
University of Oklahoma alumni
21st-century American journalists